The South Prairie Community Hall near Minot, North Dakota was built in 1920.  It was listed on the National Register of Historic Places in 2006.

It is the last surviving one of five town and community halls on the prairies south of Minot.

References

Government buildings on the National Register of Historic Places in North Dakota
Government buildings completed in 1920
National Register of Historic Places in Ward County, North Dakota
1920 establishments in North Dakota